Robert Jay Charlson was an American atmospheric scientist, climate scientist, pioneer in the fields of climate forcing and climate change, and coauthor of the CLAW hypothesis.Charlson is known for his research in atmospheric chemistry, aerosol physics, aerosol/cloud/climate interaction, aerosol and cloud instrumentation.

Life and times
On September 30, 1936, Robert Jay Charlson was born at Santa Clara, California and his mother's name was listed as Stucky. On March 16, 1964, a marriage license listed Robert J. Charlson, age 27, born at San Jose, California, joined Patricia E. Allison, age 23, born at Greenville, South Carolina, in lawful wedlock in the University Christion Church at King County, Washington. The license was issued on February 24, 1964, and filed with the King County Auditor on March 18, 1964.

Education and career
Charlson received a BS and MS degrees in chemistry from Stanford University. Harold S. Johnston was his undergraduate advisor. His master's thesis was titled: “Techniques for High Speed Flash Photolysis”.  In 1964, Charlson was awarded a PhD in atmospheric sciences from the University of Washington, Seattle. His advisor was Konrad Büttner. As of 2021, he is professor emeritus of Atmospheric Sciences, chemistry, and geophysics at the University of Washington in Seattle, Washington.

Charlson was one of the lead authors for Chapter 2, "Radiative forcing of climate change" in the 1995 Intergovernmental Panel on Climate Change (IPCC) working group report. He has also been a contributing author for the 1990 and the 2001 IPCC assessment reports.

Selected publications

Awards and honors

Stanford University, Honors at entrance
Phi Lambda Upsilon member
Stanford University Undergraduate Scholarships, 1955–1958
Imperial College, London University, Fulbright Scholar, 1964–1965, Cloud Physics.
NATO Visiting Lectureship in Meteorology, Germany and England, September–October 1969
Sigma Xi, RESA Regional Lecturer, Pacific Area, 1972–1973; Speaker at Spring 1973 Initiation Meeting, University of Washington
World Meteorological Association, Gerbier-Mumm Award, (with James Lovelock, Meinrat Andreae and Stephen G. Warren), interdisciplinary scientific paper pertaining to meteorology, 1988
In 1993, Stockholm University awarded Charlson an honorary doctoral degree, "Hedersdoktor," PhDh.c.
American Meteorological Society, fellow, 1995
American Geophysical Union, fellow, 1995
In 1995, as a result of the work Charlson pursued, the journal Science named the sulfate aerosol as one of nine runners-up for Molecule of the Year.
In 2009, Charlson received the ASLI Choice Award from the Atmospheric Science Librarians International for the work titled: “Clouds in the perturbed climate system: their relationship to energy balance, atmospheric dynamics, and precipitation”. This publication was edited by Jost Heintzenberg and Robert J. Charlson. The award is the highest award and represents ASLI's Choice “for quality, authoritativeness, and comprehensive coverage of new and important aspects of cloud research”.

Patents
Photon-counting integrating nephelometer. U.S. Patent No. 3,953,127.
Measurement of the Lidar ratio for atmospheric aerosols using a 180-degree-backscatter nephelometer. U.S. Patent No. 6,404,494.
Method and apparatus for investigating temporal development of particles or droplets in gas-vapor mixture. U.S. Patent No. 6,766,702.

References

External links
Atmospheric Science Librarians International
World Meteorological Association

1936 births
Living people
People from Santa Clara, California
20th-century American inventors
21st-century American inventors
American atmospheric scientists
Stanford University alumni
Stockholm University alumni
University of Washington alumni
University of Washington faculty
Intergovernmental Panel on Climate Change lead authors
Intergovernmental Panel on Climate Change contributing authors